The  are a group of five Japanese swords. Three are National Treasures of Japan, one an Imperial Property, and one a holy relic of Nichiren Buddhism. Among the five, some regard Dōjigiri as "the yokozuna of all Japanese swords" along with Ōkanehira (:ja:大包平).

Origin
As of 2017, the term is widely-recognized among Japanese sword connoisseurs. For example, the national institute uses the word in an explanation for Mikazuki. Although some researchers claim the term dates back to the Muromachi period (1333–1573), its origin is unknown. Suiken Fukunaga cites a book  written in the fifth year of Genroku (1692–1693), so the term is traceable back to at least the late 17th century if the citation is to be believed.

Kanzan Sato commented, in terms of pure quality from the viewpoint of modern sword connoisseurs, although they are undoubtedly five of the greatest swords, it is doubtful whether they are the five greatest swords. He guessed the criteria of this selection include the values of legends associated to these famous swords.

List
Sometimes the selection differs from the following list. For instance, a list by Kanzan Sato includes , an Imperial Property of Japan, instead of Onimaru  (although in other parts of the same book Sato contradicts himself and uses the same list as the following ).

See also 
 Three Great Spears of Japan

Notes

References
 Sato, Kanzan (1990) (in Japanese) . Akita Shoten. .
 Fukunaga, Suiken (1993) (in Japanese) . Yūzankaku. .

Ashikaga shōguns
Individual Japanese swords
Mythological swords
National Treasures of Japan
Nichiren Buddhism
Regalia